The Watford Miniature Railway is a  gauge railway in Cassiobury Park, Watford, Hertfordshire.

History 
The railway was opened at Easter 1959 by Charles Reed as a circuit adjacent to the River Gade.  Initially there were two locomotives: an LMS Compound steam locomotive named Maid Marion and a petrol-powered 08 Shunter locomotive.  In 1968 the steam locomotive left and the railway was sold to George Webb.

In 1979 the railway was sold to Jeff Price, who set about expanding and improving it.  In the 1980s the station was rebuilt on a new site, accessed by a gated level crossing over one of the paths in the park.  More coaches were added and a number of steam locomotives used.

On Price's retirement in 2017, the railway was sold to new operators Southern Miniature Railways.

Layout 
The main station is adjacent to the paddling pools and main children's playground.  From here the line turns 120 degrees, crosses a level crossing, and rounds on itself in a wooded area adjacent to the River Gade.

Trains run regularly at weekends and school holidays throughout the year.

Locomotives

Current locomotives

Former locomotives

References

External links 

 Watford Miniature Railway website

Watford
Miniature railways in the United Kingdom